Girne American University is a non-profit university in Girne, a city in Northern Cyprus. The university was founded in 1985 by Mr Serhat Akpinar as an institution of American-style higher education. It part of YÖDAK, the higher education coordinating council of Northern Cyprus   and YÖK, its Turkish parallel.

Faculties
 Faculty of Engineering includes 7 departments: 
 Civil Engineering 
 Computer Engineering
 Electrical and Electronics Engineering
 Industrial Engineering
 Energy Systems Engineering
 Mechanical Engineering
 Automotive Engineering
 Faculty of Business & Economics
 Faculty of Architecture, Design and Fine Arts. In 2013, the Faculty was announced as one of the top 10 Architecture Faculties in Turkey and North Cyprus by Mimari Medya (Architecture Media Network). In 2012 and 2013, the master programme in Construction Management was chosen by Eduniversal as one of the best 100 master programmes in the world. Established in 1985, the Faculty has 4 departments including:
 Architecture
 Interior Design
 Graphic Design
 Painting 
 Faculty of Education
 Faculty of Communication
 Faculty of Humanities
 Faculty of Law
 Faculty of Health Sciences
 Graduate School of Science & Technology (Engineering Master & PhD Programs)
 Graduate School of Social Sciences (Master & PhD Programs)
 School of Applied Sciences
 Marine School
 Nursing School
 School of Sport and Recreation
 School of the Performing Arts

Research centres

Research Centre for Applied Science, Engineering and Technology 
In GAU Research Centers and Laboratories, advanced researches are performed in the fields of Applied Science, Engineering and Technology.

International Centre for Heritage Studies (ICHS) 
The International Center for Heritage Studies (ICHS) is a research and design centre founded within the Faculty of Architecture, Design and Fine Arts (established since 2012) and is working on historical, landscape and archaeological research and the restoration project for the Acheiropoietos Monastery in Cyprus.

International academic organizations

ISEAIA 
The annual International Symposium on Engineering, Artificial Intelligence and Applications (ISEAIA) is a platform for researchers, practitioners, developers and educators to share their experiences in the fields of engineering, artificial intelligence and their applications in.

ISEAIA2013 was held between 6 and 8 November 2013 in Girne/Cyprus. ISEAIA2014 was held between 5 and 7 November 2014 in Girne/Cyprus.

CAUMME II 
CAUMME, Contemporary Architecture and Urbanism in the Mediterranean and the Middle-East, is a series of conferences organized by AUMME. The 2nd CAUMME Conference organized by Girne American University, Yıldız Technical University and Qatar University in 2014. The organization of a biennial international symposium in different areas of architecture and urbanism constitutes the main academic activity of CAUMME series of conferences. The first CAUMME international symposium was held in 2012 at Yıldız Technical University. The main motivation of the second CAUMME international symposium was on the concept of Post-Professionalism.

Journal
Girne American University publishes a scientific journal called GAU Journal of Social and Applied Science.

Notable alumni

 Asim Vehbi, Girne CEO and Vice-Chancellor
 Nazım Çavuşoğlu, M.A., Member of Parliament, Turkish Republic of Northern Cyprus
 Özcan Can, former Member of Istanbul Metropolitan City Council, Turkey
 Ömer Tuğsal Doruk, PhD in P., Lecturer at Üsküdar University, Turkey, and the author of Shadow Banking and Turkey
 Gossy Ukanwoke, founder of Beni American University and Students Circle Network

Affiliations
The university is a member of the Caucasus University Association.

References

External links
 Accreditations
 Official University Webpage
 Canterbury Campus of GAU
 US Campus of GAU

Girne American University
Educational institutions established in 1985
1985 establishments in Northern Cyprus
Kyrenia